Posht Gur-e Choqa Maran (also Romanized as Posht Gūr-e Choqā Mārān; also known as Posht Kar) is a village in Khaneh Shur Rural District, in the Central District of Salas-e Babajani County, Kermanshah Province, Iran. At the 2006 census, its population was 286, in 60 families.

References 

Populated places in Salas-e Babajani County